Sirocco is a hot, fast Mediterranean wind.

Sirocco or similar spellings may also refer to:

Media and entertainment
 Sirocco (album) by Australian Crawl
 Sirocco (film), starring Humphrey Bogart
 Sirocco (play), a play by Noël Coward
 Sirocco (Australian band)
 Scirocco (film), directed by Aldo Lado
 Siroco (album) by Paco de Lucia
 Paptimus Scirocco, a character from the anime series Mobile Suit Zeta Gundam
 Scirocco, a character in the Silverwing series of books
 "Scirocco," a song by Italian singer-songwriter Francesco Guccini on his album Signora Bovary
The Scirocco, a vessel of the Martian Congressional Republic Navy in The Expanse TV series.

Cars and aircraft
 Aviasud Sirocco, a French ultra-light aircraft
AC Sirocco nG, an updated model
 Scirocco-Powell, a former racing car constructor
 Volkswagen Scirocco, a car
 Sirocco, the name of a Lackawanna Railroad train car involved in the Rockport train wreck

Ships 
 Siroco (L 9012), a landing ship of the French Navy
 Spanish submarine Siroco (S-72), an Agosta 90B class submarine of the Spanish Navy
 French destroyer Siroco
 HMAS Sirocco
 USS Sirocco

Other uses
 Mehmed Siroco (1525–1571), nickname of an Ottoman admiral
 Sirocco (parrot), a famous kakapo
 Sirocco (restaurant), a 63rd floor rooftop restaurant atop the State Tower in Bangkok, Thailand
 Shirocco, a German thoroughbred racehorse
 Sirocco, codename for the S1 Core, an open source hardware microprocessor design
 Sirocco, a model of the Nokia 8800 mobile phone and revived more recently for the Nokia 8 Sirocco
 Sirocco Works F.C., a football club in Northern Ireland
 SIROCCO, the abbreviated name for the academic conference International Colloquium on Structural Information and Communication Complexity
 Sirocco, a type of forward curved centrifugal fan developed by Samuel Cleland Davidson